Diyarbakır Province (Zazaki: Suke Diyarbekır ) is a province in southeastern Turkey. The province covers an area of 15,355 km2 and its population is 1,528,958. The provincial capital is the city of Diyarbakır. The province has a Kurdish majority and is considered part of Turkish Kurdistan.

History 
It has been home to many civilisations and the surrounding area including itself is home to many Mesolithic era stone carvings and artifacts. The province has been ruled by the Akkadians, Hurrians, Mittani, Medes, Hittites, Armenians, Arameans, Neo-Babylonians, Achaemenids, Greeks, Romans, Parthians, Byzantium, Sassanids, Arabs, Seljuk Empire, Mongol Empire, Safavid dynasty, Marwanids, and Ayyubids.

In Turkey 
In order to Turkify the local population, in June 1927 the Law 1164 was passed which allowed the creation of Inspectorates-General (Turkish: Umumi Müffetişlik, UM). The Diyarbakır province was therefore included in the so-called First Inspectorate General, which span over the provinces of Hakkâri, Siirt, Van, Mardin, Bitlis, Sanlıurfa, Elaziğ and Diyarbakır. The first UM was created on the 1 January 1928 and centered in Diyarbakır. The UM was governed by an Inspector General, who governed with a wide-ranging authority over civilian, juridical and military matters. The office of the Inspector General was dissolved in 1952 during the government of the Democrat Party. The Diyarbakır province though was still banned for foreign citizens until 1965. Within the policy of turkification, during the 1930s, several place-names in the province were renamed into names which denoted a Turkish origin.

Modern history 
From 1987 to 2002, Diyarbakır Province was part of the OHAL (state of emergency) region which was declared to counter the Kurdistan Workers' Party (PKK) and governed by a so-called Supergovernor who got invested with additional powers than a normal Governor. In 1987 he was given the power to relocate and resettle whole villages, settlements and hamlets. In December 1990 with the Decree No. 430, the supergovernor and the provincial governors in the OHAL region received immunity against any legal prosecution in connections with actions they made due to the powers they received with the Decree No. 430.

Archaeology 
Archaeologists headed by the vice-rector of Dicle University, professor Ahmet Tanyıldız, have claimed to discover the graves of the Seljuk Sultan of Rum Kilij Arslan I, who defeated the Crusaders. They also revealed his daughter Saide Hatun's burial in Silvan. Researchers dug 2 meters deep across a 35-square-meter area and focused their works on two gravesites in Orta Çeşme Park.

Districts
Diyarbakır province is divided into 17 districts:

Population

See also 

 Diyarbakır Vilayet
 Kurdistan Eyalet 
 Diyarbekir Eyalet

References

External links 
  Pictures of the capital of this province
  Diyarbakir Weather Forecast Information 
  Historical Armenian presence in Diyarbakir Province
 Tourism information is available in English at the Southeastern Anatolian Promotion Project site.
  Diyarbakir Live News

 
Provinces of Turkey
Turkish Kurdistan
Upper Mesopotamia